Pool is an unincorporated community in southwestern Nicholas County, West Virginia, United States.  It lies along CR 41-7 just east of Route 41, south of the town of Summersville, the county seat of Nicholas County.  Its elevation is 2,142 feet (653 m).  Although Pool is unincorporated, it has a ZIP code of 26684; it once had its own post office, which opened on March 31, 1881, and closed on March 19, 2011. The community took its name from standing pool of water near the original town site.

References

Unincorporated communities in Nicholas County, West Virginia
Unincorporated communities in West Virginia